Plana, South Dakota is a former village within Cambria Township in Brown County, South Dakota, United States. It was established in 1887 and grew to include three grain elevators, a railroad depot and more. It declined after its general store was burned in 1927. In 1994 the only surviving structures were a former community hall, a school, and the Welsh Presbyterian Church.

References

Geography of Brown County, South Dakota
Former populated places in South Dakota